Lunch Boxes & Choklit Cows is a compilation album of previously unreleased demo tracks recorded in the early 1990s by rock band Marilyn Manson (then known as Marilyn Manson & The Spooky Kids). Original guitarist Scott Putesky ("Daisy Berkowitz") obtained the rights to these and 11 other recordings in a lawsuit against Brian Warner ("Marilyn Manson"), and announced that this release is the first in a planned series of Spooky Kids CDs.  Some are from demos and others have never been previously released.  These are digitally remastered and Putesky says they sound better than the original cassettes because of it.

The album originally came packaged with a "bonus" DVD and slightly different artwork. The original cover had 5 cartoon figures of the band drawn by Marilyn Manson.  However, after a lawsuit was filed, Putesky removed the artwork (originally by Warner) and the DVD (which contained footage of Warner & Stephen Bier) and re-released the CD.  The re-released cover is the same as the original except the cartoon images are removed.

Copies of the original version with the DVD and artwork can occasionally be found on eBay or Amazon.

CD track listing 
"Red (in My) Head" – 4:24
recorded January 1990 on the Beaver Meat Cleaver Beat demo.
"Dune Buggy" – 4:20
recorded August 1990 on the Grist-O-Line demo.
"Insect Pins" – 5:48
recorded February 1993.
"Learning to Swim" – 4:11
recorded March 1991 on the Lunchbox demo.
"Negative Three" – 4:38
recorded December 1991 on the After School Special demo.
"Meat for a Queen" – 3:02
recorded August 1990 on the Grist-O-Line demo.
"White Knuckles" – 2:24
recorded March 1990 on the Beaver Meat Cleaver Beat demo.
"Scaredy Cat" – 3:22
recorded November 1993.
"Thingmaker" [live] – 4:12
recorded July 1992 live in a rehearsal studio.  It is originally from the Family Jams demo.
"Thrift" [live] – 6:24
recorded January 1992 live in a rehearsal studio.  It is originally from the Refrigerator demo.

Bonus DVD listing (out of print) 
"White Knuckles" (Live footage)
"Meat for a Queen" (Live footage)
"Dune Buggy" (Live footage)
"Spooky Gallery" (Still images)

Credits 
Marilyn Manson — voices
Daisy Berkowitz — guitar, liner notes
Madonna Wayne Gacy — keyboards
Gidget Gein — bass
Sara Lee Lucas — drums
Paul Klein – executive producer
Mike Fuller – mastering
Rama Barwick – project coordinator
Sharon Slade – project coordinator
Aldo Venturacci – art direction
Sean Weeks – design

References

External links 
Series of press releases about this release
 http://spookykids.net/indexxx.html

Marilyn Manson (band) albums
2004 compilation albums
2004 video albums
2004 live albums
Live video albums
Unauthorized albums